Ruth Khasaya Oniang’o (born November 9, 1946) is a Kenyan Professor of Nutrition and a former member of Parliament. She created Rural Outreach Africa to empower smallholders to address malnutrition, she oversees her country's nutrition policy and she is on the board of the Centre for Agriculture and Bioscience International.

Life
Oniang’o was born in 1946. She attended Washington University where she obtained graduate and master's degrees between 1969 and 1974. She began university teaching in 1978. Oniang'o earned her bachelor's degree and master's degree from Washington State University, before finishing her education at University of Nairobi. In 1983 she was awarded a PhD by the University of Nairobi in Food Science and Nutrition.

She was a leading nutritionist and became a Professor at Jomo Kenyatta University. Her research focused on topics such as food security, nutrition and pregnancy, childhood nutrition and agricultural processing.

She founded the Rural Outreach Program in 1992 to provide smalls farmers with indigenous soil testing and other resources needed to be productive. Oniang'o founded the African Journal of Food, Agriculture, Nutrition and Development in 2001 to highlight relevant academic research in the field. She is currently the editor-in-chief of the journal.

In 2002 she left academia to become active in Kenyan politics. She served in the Kenyan Parliament from 2003 to 2007. While serving, Oniang'o helped pass the Kenya Biosafety Bill and the Nutritionists and Dietetics Bills. In 2005, Oniang'o established the Diana Elukhambi Health Centre in Kakamega.

In 2018 she was on the board of the UK based NGO the Centre for Agriculture and Bioscience International.

Oniang’o leads her country's Food Security and Nutrition Taskforce who are charged with overseeing the delivery of the National Food and Nutrition Policy. Oniang'o also leads the Rural Outreach Program, a non-profit organization which supports farmers in food production and agricultural processing. The Rural Outreach Program works with Kenyan small farmers to promote the growth of indigenous crops like sorghum, cassava, arrowroot, and jute mallow as a solution to ensuring food security.

Awards
Oniang'o has won several awards for her work in agriculture and food policy, including the Distinguished Service Medal and Silver Star. In 2014, she was awarded the International Food and Agribusiness Management Association (IFAMA) Lifetime Award. She also won the Africa Food Prize in 2017 for her work with the Rural Outreach Program. On June 22, 2018, Oniang'o was awarded an honorary Doctor of Science degree from University of Aberdeen in recognition of her contributions to her field.

Oniang'o was cited as one of the Top 100 most influential Africans by New African magazine in 2017.

References

1946 births
Living people
Kenyan women in politics
Women nutritionists
Women food scientists
Kenyan politicians